In Greek mythology, Agave (or 'high-born'), the daughter of Cadmus,  was a princess of Thebes and the queen of the Maenads, followers of Dionysus (also known as Bacchus).

Family 
Agave was the eldest daughter of Cadmus, the king and founder of the city of Thebes, Greece, and of the goddess Harmonia. Her sisters were Autonoë, Ino and Semele, and her brother was Polydorus. Agave married Echion, one of the five Spartoi, and was the mother of Pentheus, a king of Thebes, and Epirus.

Mythology 
In Euripides' play, The Bacchae, Theban Maenads murdered King Pentheus after he banned the worship of Dionysus because he denied Dionysus' divinity. Dionysus, Pentheus' cousin, lured Pentheus to the woods—Pentheus wanted to see what he thought were the sexual activities of the women—where the Maenads tore him apart and his corpse was mutilated by his own mother, Agave. Agave and Pentheus' aunt, Autonoe, tore his limb from limb in a Bacchic frenzy. Thinking that she and the other women had just killed a lion—for Dionysus had driven them mad—Agave carried her son's head on a stick back to Thebes, only realizing the truth when confronted by her father, Cadmus.

This murder also served as Dionysus' vengeance on Agave (and her sisters Ino and Autonoë). Semele, during her pregnancy with Dionysus, was destroyed by the sight of the splendor of Zeus. Her sisters spread the report that she had only endeavored to conceal unmarried sex with a mortal man, by pretending that Zeus was the father of her child, and said that her destruction was a just punishment for her falsehood. This calumny was afterwards most severely avenged upon Agave. For, after Dionysus, the son of Semele, had traversed the world, he came to Thebes and sent the Theban women mad, compelling them to celebrate his Dionysiac festivals on Mount Cithaeron. Pentheus, wishing to prevent or stop these riotous proceedings, was persuaded by a disguised Dionysus to go himself to Cithaeron, but was torn to pieces there by his own mother Agave, who in her frenzy believed him to be a wild lion.

For this transgression, according to Hyginus, Agave was exiled from Thebes and fled to Illyria to marry King Lycotherses, and then killed him in order to gain the city for her father Cadmus. According to Smith, Hyginus' account is "manifestly transplaced by Hyginus, and must have belonged to an earlier part of the story of Agave".

Genealogy

Family tree of the Theban royal house

Gallery

Notes

References 

Apollodorus, The Library with an English Translation by Sir James George Frazer, F.B.A., F.R.S. in 2 Volumes, Cambridge, MA, Harvard University Press; London, William Heinemann Ltd. 1921. ISBN 0-674-99135-4. Online version at the Perseus Digital Library. Greek text available from the same website.
Bell, Robert E., Women of Classical Mythology: A Biographical Dictionary. ABC-Clio. 1991. .
Graves, Robert, The Greek Myths, Harmondsworth, London, England, Penguin Books, 1960. 
Graves, Robert, The Greek Myths: The Complete and Definitive Edition. Penguin Books Limited. 2017. 
Hesiod, Theogony, in The Homeric Hymns and Homerica with an English Translation by Hugh G. Evelyn-White, Cambridge, MA.,Harvard University Press; London, William Heinemann Ltd. 1914.
Homer, The Iliad with an English Translation by A.T. Murray, Ph.D. in two volumes. Cambridge, MA., Harvard University Press; London, William Heinemann, Ltd. 1924. . Online version at the Perseus Digital Library.
Homer, Homeri Opera in five volumes. Oxford, Oxford University Press. 1920. . Greek text available at the Perseus Digital Library.
Hyginus, Gaius Julius, The Myths of Hyginus. Edited and translated by Mary A. Grant, Lawrence: University of Kansas Press, 1960.
Ovid, Metamorphoses, Brookes More. Boston. Cornhill Publishing Co. 1922. Online version at the Perseus Digital Library.
Smith, William; Dictionary of Greek and Roman Biography and Mythology, London (1873). "Agave"
Princesses in Greek mythology
Theban characters in Greek mythology
Theban mythology
Dionysus in mythology